OFK Malesh is a football club from Berovo, North Macedonia. They are currently competing in the Macedonian Third League (East Division).

History
The club was founded in 1919.

It is the second oldest club in the country. The first president and founder of the club was merchant Ilija Kafedziski from Berovo, who also bought the first football.

References

External links
Club info at MacedonianFootball 
Football Federation of Macedonia 

Football clubs in North Macedonia
Association football clubs established in 1919
FK Males
FK Males